Boubacar Djeidy Kébé (born 10 May 1987) is a Burkinabé-Malian professional footballer who plays for L'Entente SSG in Championnat National 2. He also holds French citizenship.

Club career
Kébé was born in Ouagadougou, Burkina Faso. He formerly played for Girondins de Bordeaux, FC Libourne-Saint-Seurin and Nimes Olympique by Nimes shot 7 goals in 15 games and was transferred on 16 December to RC Strasbourg.

He joined Iranian Pro League side Damash Gilan in December 2012. He made his debut on 4 December 2012 for Damash, he came on as a substitute in 52nd minute and scored in the 85th minute to make it a 1–0 victory over Esteghlal. After playing for Damash for one and a half years, he signed a one-year contract with Esteghlal on 6 November 2013. He made his debut in a Hazfi Cup match over Caspian Qazvin but he was injured in the 10th minute and was out for one month. He scored his first goal for Esteghlal on 9 February 2014 in a match against Saipa in his first league appearance.

International career
He also capped for Mali U20 at 2005 African Youth Championship.

Personal life
His father is Malian and mother is Burkinabé, Yahia Kébé is the elder brother from Boubacar Kébé and sister Asta.

Career statistics

References

1987 births
Living people
Malian footballers
Expatriate footballers in France
Expatriate footballers in Iran
Al-Hilal Club (Omdurman) players
Al-Raed FC players
AS Cherbourg Football players
Damash Gilan players
Esteghlal F.C. players
FC Girondins de Bordeaux players
FC Libourne players
Nîmes Olympique players
Progresso da Lunda Sul players
RC Strasbourg Alsace players
Girabola players
Entente SSG players
Saudi Professional League players
Ligue 2 players
Championnat National players
Championnat National 2 players
Championnat National 3 players
Association football forwards
Burkinabé people of Malian descent
Burkina Faso international footballers
Mali international footballers
Sportspeople from Ouagadougou
21st-century Burkinabé people